Roger Gerber (born 28 December 1933) is a French weightlifter. He competed at the 1956 Summer Olympics and the 1960 Summer Olympics.

References

1933 births
Living people
French male weightlifters
Olympic weightlifters of France
Weightlifters at the 1956 Summer Olympics
Weightlifters at the 1960 Summer Olympics
Sportspeople from Paris
20th-century French people